Bogdang (Bukdang, Beyoqdan, Biagdangdo) is a village in the Leh district of Ladakh, India. It is located in Nubra tehsil.

Location
Bogdang is located in the Shyok River valley after it narrows near Yagulung, the portion sometimes called the Chorbat Valley, distinguishing it from the "Lower Nubra" (the wider Shyok Valley). During the First Kashmir War of 1947–48, the Gilgit Scouts that invaded the region were pushed beyond the village, and the cease-fire line was set at Chalunka, the next village on the Shyok River. Thus Bogdang was the northernmost village of Ladakh on the Shyok River until 1971.

In the Indo-Pakistani War of 1971, the Ladakh Scouts conquered Chalunka, Turtuk Thang Tyakshi small villages of the Chorbat Valley, making Bogdang safely in the interior of Indian-administered Kashmir.

Demographics
According to the 2011 census of India, Bogdang has 272 households. The effective literacy rate (i.e. the literacy rate of population excluding children aged 6 and below) is 64.89%.

References

Bibliography 
 

Villages in Nubra tehsil